Nancy Elizabeth Hollister (née Putnam; born May 22, 1949) is an American politician from the U.S. state of Ohio. Hollister was the first and, to date, only female governor of Ohio, serving briefly from December 1998 to January 1999. She attended Kent State University, and upon leaving college she became a housewife.  She began her political career in the 1980s. She is a member of the Republican Party.

Early life
Putnam was born in Terre Haute, Indiana, the daughter of Benjamin Hay Putnam Jr. (1925-2007) and Mary Elizabeth White (1926-1990). Her parents had married in 1945 in West Virginia and had moved briefly back to Terre Haute (her mother's hometown) before moving to Marietta, Ohio, where her father's family resided. Her 6th great-grandfather was Revolutionary War General Israel Putnam. Her 8th great-grandmother was Bathsheba Folger Pope, an accuser of witches during the Salem Witch Trials.

She has five siblings: Emily, Esther, Sarah and Benjamin Hay Putnam, III.

Political career (1980–1990)
Nancy Hollister first entered public office when she was elected to the Marietta City Council in 1980.
Hollister would serve on city council until being elected Mayor of Marietta in 1984. As Mayor, Hollister worked to attract new businesses to the area, promote tourism, and secured funding for a new bridge across the Ohio River.

Political career (1991–1994)
Since Hollister was a mayor in Southeastern Ohio, Governor Voinovich appointed Nancy Hollister as director of the Governor's Office of Appalachia. In this position, Hollister would advise the Governor on how to improve the economy, and life, for twenty-nine counties.

Lieutenant governor
Hollister was elected Ohio's 60th lieutenant governor in 1994 to replace incumbent lieutenant governor Mike DeWine, who was elected to the U.S. Senate. Hollister would oversee several State and Local Government Commissions. These included the Governor's Office of Appalachia, the Governor's Workforce Development Board, the Ohio Department of Agriculture, the Ohio Bureau of Employment Services, the Ohio School-to-Work Initiative, the Office of Housing and Community Partnership, the Ohio Coal Development Office, and the Ohio Farmland Preservation Task Force.

Governor of Ohio
On November 3, 1998, as part of that year's midterm election, Governor George Voinovich was elected to the United States Senate, and Bob Taft was elected to the governorship. On the same day, Hollister ran for a seat in the United States House of Representatives, having defeated former Rep. Frank Cremeans for the Republican nomination, but she lost to incumbent Democrat Ted Strickland (who would later succeed Taft as governor).

Voinovich resigned as governor on December 31, 1998 (so he could be sworn into the Senate three days later), and with that, Hollister became governor.  Hollister became Ohio's first and to date only female governor. She only served 11 days in office - which would also make her Ohio's shortest-serving governor - as she was essentially finishing out Voinovich's term. She was succeeded by Taft, whose term officially began on January 11, 1999.

Politics (2000–present)
Upon leaving the Governor's office, Hollister was appointed to the Ohio House of Representatives, representing the 93rd district, in 1999. She ran for and was elected to the seat in 2000 and 2002. In her final run for office to date, Hollister was defeated by Jennifer Garrison in 2004. A key issue in the campaign was Hollister's opposition to a constitutional amendment to ban same-sex marriage.  Garrison – the Democrat – ran to the ideological right of Hollister on the same-sex marriage ban which passed during the same 2004 election 61.71% to 38.29%.

She served on the board of trustees of the Ohio History Connection between 2011 and 2016.

As of Oct 2020 she is an ad-hoc board member of the Friends of the Museums, which manages the Campus Martius Museum and Ohio River Museum in Marietta.

In May 2016, she was appointed by Gov. John Kasich to fill a vacancy on the state Board of Education.

Personal life
She married Jeffrey Lynn Hollister (b. 1949) on March 21, 1970 in Washington, Ohio. They have five children: Jonathan Dunham Hollister (b. 1970), Jeremy Douglas Hollister (b. 1973), Justin Harrington Hollister (b. 1976), Emily Elizabeth Hollister (b. 1979) and Sarah Katherine Hollister (b. 1982).

See also

 Election Results, U.S. Representative from Ohio, 6th District
 Election Results, Ohio Lieutenant Governor
 Hollister
 List of female governors in the United States
 List of female lieutenant governors in the United States

References

External links
Profile on the Ohio Ladies Gallery website

|-

|-

|-

1949 births
Republican Party governors of Ohio
Kent State University alumni
Lieutenant Governors of Ohio
Living people
Mayors of places in Ohio
Republican Party members of the Ohio House of Representatives
Ohio city council members
Women city councillors in Ohio
Politicians from Marietta, Ohio
Women mayors of places in Ohio
Women state governors of the United States
Women state legislators in Ohio
20th-century American politicians
20th-century American women politicians
21st-century American politicians
21st-century American women politicians